The 2001 World Allround Speed Skating Championships were held on the City Park Ice Rink in Budapest, Hungary, on 10–11 February 2001.

German Anni Friesinger and Dutchman Rintje Ritsma became the world champions.

Men's championships

Allround results 

NQ = Not qualified for the 10000 m (only the best 12 are qualified)DQ = disqualified

Women's championships

Allround results 

NQ = Not qualified for the 5000 m (only the best 12 are qualified)DQ = disqualified

Rules 
All 24 participating skaters are allowed to skate the first three distances; 12 skaters may take part on the fourth distance. These 12 skaters are determined by taking the standings on the longest of the first three distances, as well as the samalog standings after three distances, and comparing these lists as follows:

 Skaters among the top 12 on both lists are qualified.
 To make up a total of 12, skaters are then added in order of their best rank on either list. Samalog standings take precedence over the longest-distance standings in the event of a tie.

References
Results on SpeedSkatingNews

World Allround Speed Skating Championships, 2001
2001 World Allround
World Allround, 2001
International sports competitions in Budapest